The Mirning or Mirniny languages are a pair of Pama–Nyungan languages of the Nullarbor Coast of Australia. 

Mirning (Mirniny)
Ngadjunmaya (Ngatjumaya)

Galaagu (Kalarko) and Kalaamaya, once thought to be related to Mirning, turn out to be closer to Nyungar.

References

 
Southwest Pama–Nyungan languages